Galumna acutirostrum is a species of mite first found in sandy soil in a dipterocarp forest of Cát Tiên National Park.

References

Further reading
Ermilov, Sergey, and Alexander E. Anichkin. "Oribatid mites (Acari: Oribatida) of fungi from Dong Nai Biosphere Reserve, Southern Vietnam."Persian Journal of Acarology 2.2 (2013).
Ermilov, S. G., W. Niedbała, and A. E. Anichkin. "Oribatid mites of Dong Nai Biosphere Reserve (= Cat Tien National Park) of Southern Vietnam, with description of a new species of Pergalumna (Acari, Oribatida, Galumnidae)."Acarina 20.1 (2012): 20-28.

Sarcoptiformes
Arthropods of Vietnam
Animals described in 2010